Dittewall is a village in Gujrat District, Pakistan, outside of the city of Gujrat. The city lies to the East of the neighboring village of Chak Pindi.

References 

Populated places in Gujrat District
Villages in Gujrat District